Ryszard Blaszka (born 2 March 1951) is a Polish sailor. He competed in the Finn event at the 1976 Summer Olympics.

References

External links
 

1951 births
Living people
Polish male sailors (sport)
Olympic sailors of Poland
Sailors at the 1976 Summer Olympics – Finn
Sportspeople from Poznań